Solnechny Bay (Bukhta Solnechnaya), is a bay in Severnaya Zemlya, Krasnoyarsk Krai, Russia.

History
There is an abandoned polar station on the eastern side of Solnechny Bay, near Cape Antsev, as well as an astronomic observatory 4 km to the west.

Geography
Solnechny Bay is a bay in the southern shore of Bolshevik Island, the southernmost island of Severnaya Zemlya. It is located on the Vilkitsky Strait coast of the island. The headland on the western side of the mouth of the bay is Cape Maysky and the eastern Cape Antsev.

The bay opens towards the south and is about 7 km wide. The Vkhodnoy Islands, a group of two islets facing the bay lie 4 km off the shore.

See also
List of research stations in the Arctic

References

External links

Weather forecast for Solnechnaya Bay - Russia
Micromycetes from soil near the Solnechnaya bay

Bays of Severnaya Zemlya
Bays of the Laptev Sea